Krasnoselsk is the name of several rural localities in Russia:
Krasnoselsk, Altai Republic, a selo in Choysky District of the Altai Republic
Krasnoselsk, Ulyanovsk Oblast, a settlement in Novospassky District of Ulyanovsk Oblast